Muhammad Noor (1925–2000) was an Indian footballer.

Muhammad Noor may also refer to:
Mohamed Noor, academic administrator and geneticist
Mohammed Noor (born 1978), Saudi Arabian footballer
Mohamud Noor, American politician and computer scientist
Mohamed Noor (born 1985), convicted of the killing of Justine Damond
Muhammad Noor (1955–2014), a Pakistani tissue seller who was murdered in Singapore